Montenegro participated at the Olympic Games for the first time as an independent nation in 2008, at the Beijing Games.  Previously, Montenegrin athletes have competed as part of Serbia and Montenegro in 2004 and as part of Yugoslavia before that.

The National Olympic Committee for Montenegro is the Montenegrin Olympic Committee.  It was created in 2006 and recognized by the International Olympic Committee in 2007.

Participation

Timeline of participation

Medal tables

Medals by Summer Games

Medals by Winter Games

Medals by sport

Olympic participants

Summer Olympics

List of medalists 
On August 11, 2012, Montenegro won its first ever Olympic medal as an independent country, taking silver in women's handball.

Before the 2012 Olympic Games, several other athletes from the Socialist Republic of Montenegro and Republic of Montenegro have also won Olympic medals in five different sports as part of teams representing Yugoslavia and Serbia and Montenegro at the Olympics, but none as individual competitors.

See also
 List of flag bearers for Montenegro at the Olympics
 Montenegro at the Paralympics

References

External links